Balgeh Shir (also Romanized as Balgeh Shīr; also known as Balgashīr, Balgekh-Shir, Balkeh Shīr, and Bilkehshīr) is a village in Howmeh Rural District, in the Central District of Khodabandeh County, Zanjan Province, Iran. At the 2006 census, its population was 1,499, in 275 families.

References 

Populated places in Khodabandeh County